The Baluarte de San Andres is a bastion in Intramuros, which is a part of the Spanish colonial fortification in the historic Walled City. It was built in 1603 to protect the Puerto Real and the southeastern part of Intramuros. It was also known as Baluarte De San Nicolas because it was located just in front of the Iglesia de San Nicolas de Tolentino, which is now the site of the present-day Manila Bulletin Building.

External links

 Intramuros Administration – Official website

Forts in the Philippines
Spanish Colonial Fortifications of the Philippines
Buildings and structures in Intramuros
Tourist attractions in Manila